The Gibbsboro School District is a community public school district that serves students in pre-kindergarten through eighth grade from Gibbsboro, in Camden County, New Jersey, United States.

As of the 2018–19 school year, the district, comprising one school, had an enrollment of 273 students and 26.4 classroom teachers (on an FTE basis), for a student–teacher ratio of 10.3:1.

The district is classified by the New Jersey Department of Education as being in District Factor Group "FG", the fourth-highest of eight groupings. District Factor Groups organize districts statewide to allow comparison by common socioeconomic characteristics of the local districts. From lowest socioeconomic status to highest, the categories are A, B, CD, DE, FG, GH, I and J.

Public school students in ninth through twelfth grades attend Eastern Regional High School, part of the Eastern Camden County Regional High School District, a limited-purpose, public regional school district that also serves students  from the constituent communities of Berlin Borough and Voorhees Township. As of the 2018–19 school year, the high school had an enrollment of 1,955 students and 140.0 classroom teachers (on an FTE basis), for a student–teacher ratio of 14.0:1.

Awards and recognition
The New Jersey Alliance for Social, Emotional and Character Development (NJASECD) recognized the Gibbsboro School as 2013 New Jersey School of Character (NJSOC), one of 11 schools in the state to earn the honor. The school was recognized as a National School of Character Finalist in March 2014.

School
The Gibbsboro Public School served a total of 275 students in the 2018–19 school year.
Jack Marcellus, Principal

Administration
Core members of the school's administration are:
Jack Marcellus, Superintendent
Frank Domin, Business Administrator / Board Secretary

Board of education
The district's board of education has nine members who set policy and oversee the fiscal and educational operation of the district through its administration. As a Type II school district, the board's trustees are elected directly by voters to serve three-year terms of office on a staggered basis, with three seats up for election each year held (since 2012) as part of the November general election.

References

External links 
Gibbsboro School District

School Data for the Gibbsboro School District, National Center for Education Statistics
Eastern Camden County Regional High School District

Gibbsboro, New Jersey
New Jersey District Factor Group FG
School districts in Camden County, New Jersey